The Moon and the Other is a science fiction novel  by American writer John Kessel.

Plot
In the twenty-second century, millions live in underground cities under the Moon’s surface. One city-state, the Society of Cousins, is a matriarchy that gets involved in a war with the Organization of Lunar States.

References

External links
Goodreads

2017 American novels
English-language novels
2017 science fiction novels
American science fiction novels
Simon & Schuster books
Novels set in the 22nd century
Novels set on the Moon